is a Japanese manga artist  from Saitama Prefecture.

His debut work is The Ping Pong Club, published in Young Magazine. It was adopted into a 26-episode anime series in 1995. In 1996, he won the Kodansha Manga Award for The Ping Pong Club. In March 2021, Kodansha USA licensed Ciguatera.

Two of his series have been adapted to the big screen, namely Himizu in 2011, and Himeanoru in 2016.

Works

References

External links 
 
 Profile at The Ultimate Manga Page 

1972 births
Living people
Manga artists from Saitama Prefecture
Winner of Kodansha Manga Award (General)